Viru-Nigula is a small borough in Lääne-Viru County, Estonia. It is the administrative centre of Viru-Nigula Parish. Viru-Nigula has a population of 336 (as of 1 January 2010).

Viru-Nigula's church was built some time between the 15th and 18th centuries.

References

External links
Viru-Nigula Parish 

Boroughs and small boroughs in Estonia
Kreis Wierland